Acrolepia nothocestri is a moth of the family Acrolepiidae. It was first described by August Busck in 1914. It is endemic to the Hawaiian island of Oahu.

The larvae feed on Nothocestrum longifolium. They mine the leaves of their host plant.

References

External links

Acrolepiidae
Endemic moths of Hawaii
Moths described in 1914